Dino Dvornik (20 August 1964 – 7 September 2008) was a Croatian singer-songwriter, music producer, actor and reality television star known as "the Croatian king of funk".

Biography

Early life
A son of renowned actor Boris Dvornik and mother Diana Dvornik (née Tomić), Dino was born in Split, at that time within Yugoslav republic of Croatia. He and his elder brother Dean would play alongside their father in mainstream 1970s movies and TV shows in Yugoslavia. These included Naše malo misto (1970–1971), Mater (1976),  Hajdučka vremena (1977), Priko sinjeg mora (1979), as well as the TV show Ljubav je hleb s devet kora (1990) and A Wonderful Night in Split (2004) by director Arsen A. Ostojić, a movie which achieved many honors at various film festivals.

In August 1989 Dvornik married his wife Danijela Kuljiš, with whom he had a daughter Ella who is today an influencer.

Career
Dvornik was best known to the public as a musician more so than an actor as he only took sporadic forays into acting over the years. His music had originally made him famous, earning him wide popularity across the regions of the former Yugoslavia. In the early 1980s Dino and his brother Dean founded Kineski zid, a pop band named after the building in which the Dvornik family lived at that time in Split. It was the first domestic funk record released in Yugoslavia. He had been a perfectionist by reputation who would lock himself in the studio for months. However, differences between the interests of the band members and the public led the band to an early breakup.

Dvornik's influences included James Brown, Stevie Wonder and other funk artists. His unique style of music earned him the monikers "King of Funk" and "Funk Daddy". Dino was also known for his changing haircuts and his taste for stylish and trendy clothes. He was a born entertainer who would keep his fans amused during and in between songs, making sure nobody would leave his shows unhappy.

Wider success and personal feedback
Dvornik had been emerging on the Yugoslav music scene when the war broke out. Privately, he had been praised by many for his honesty and friendship in the true sense of the word and he also had fans all over the world, particularly amongst people originating from the former Yugoslavia. Dvornik would play shows all over Europe and in the United States. His biggest hit amongst many, arguably, is "Afrika" (taken from the 1997 album Enfant terrible). His down-to-earth, endearing attitude was much appreciated by his fans. Dvornik was described as being friendly to all, often walking and living his life in full public view; never turning away from the attention of fans, and even joining them socially in the bars and cafés.

His popularity was built on a combination of intelligent song lyrics and energetic, wild stage performances. In this early stage of his career he chose his haircut and outfit to resemble Morrissey from The Smiths. At 1988 Zagreb Fest, Dvornik first made a name for himself when he received the award for best debutant for his song "Tebi pripadam" (I Belong To You). The very same year he released his first solo album, self-titled Dino Dvornik followed by Kreativni nered in 1989. Both became huge hits and made him a superstar in short time. After two other good albums, a studio and a live album which went unnoticed because of the war in his country, Dvornik finally switched from funk to house music in the mid 1990s. His best-known song from that period is an ode to his hometown Split, "Ništa kontra Splita", which he performed at the prestigious Split Music Festival in 1995 and eventually he won the main award for it. Dino released Enfant terrible in 1997, his best selling and most awarded album to date. He has won several Porins, the most famous Croatian music award. Although he loved his hometown Split, he was living mainly in the Croatian capital of Zagreb for professional reasons. Dvornik was a supporter of Croatian football powerhouse Hajduk Split.

Dvornik frequently expressed that the breakup of Yugoslavia had consequences on his album sales, since the market decreased and people focused on other music styles and different artists in their new originated countries during and after the war. He stood his ground on a smaller market against people who thought he was too unpredictable. The quality of his music always managed to prevail obstacles like these during his career.

He would rearrange parts on his tracks until everything was the way he thought was well enough to be shared with his fans. Dvornik was always anxious for his albums to be produced in high standard quality, something he was famous for ever since his early days in music. His most notable collaborations with other music artists in his country include those with Croatian music diva Josipa Lisac and his Montenegrin counterpart and close friend Rambo Amadeus. In his last years Dvornik would often get behind the turntables and deejay in various clubs.

Later years
Over the years, he became the subject of the media spotlight for allegedly struggling with substance abuse. He made several attempts at drug withdrawal and even though he succeeded each time, he admitted that the drugs had ruined his health and made his life a mess. Although he was a caring husband and loving father, he would still attend parties. Dvornik tended to create a warm atmosphere wherever he went, putting people instantly in a good mood. There have been many rumors about Dvornik, mostly about his substance abuse and other shocking incidents such as apparently urinating on jury members from a gallery at an award show in the late 1990s as he did not approve with their selection of artists to be honored. At a similar public event he was spotted running around in underwear to state his disgust towards the hypocrisy and petty bourgeoisie of some people attending the show.

In 2004, he starred in the movie A Wonderful Night in Split portraying a Split drug lord. The same year he became one of the first Croatian celebrities to start writing his own blog. He was later joined by his wife and his modelling daughter in doing so.

In 2006, he and his family became the stars of a Croatian reality show, Dvornikovi, an entertaining show in the manner of The Osbournes. In 2008 Dvornik was working on his forthcoming album, Pandorina kutija. The album was nearing completion. He had already released the first single for the summer, "Hipnotiziran". The album was due for release in October 2008.

Death
On 7 September 2008, just 18 days following the celebration of his 44th birthday, Dvornik died in his bed. He had been severely depressed and overdosed on antidepressants, many of which the police found in his home during the on-site investigation. His wife Danijela found him dead in bed in their apartment at 11:00 AM. Three days later Dvornik was buried at the Mirogoj Cemetery in Zagreb.

Discography 
 Dino Dvornik (1989)
 Kreativni nered (1990)
 Priroda i društvo (1993)
 Live in Munich (1994)
 Enfant terrible (1997) 
 The Best of: Vidi ove pisme (1998) 
 Big Mamma (1999)
 2002 godine u Splitu! (2001)
 Svicky (2002)
 Pandorina kutija (2008)
 Dino Dvornik The Ultimate Collection (2009) 
 Pandorina kutija (Special Edition) + 3 new tracks + DVD (2010)

References

External links 
 
 Dino Dvornik discography

1964 births
2008 suicides
20th-century Croatian male singers
Croatian pop singers
Croatian songwriters
Musicians from Split, Croatia
Yugoslav musicians
Burials at Mirogoj Cemetery
Yugoslav male singers
Indexi Award winners